Dirk Scalongne (12 December 1879 – 1 April 1973) was a Dutch fencer. He won a bronze medal in the team sabre event at the 1912 Summer Olympics.

References

External links
 

1879 births
1973 deaths
Dutch male fencers
Olympic fencers of the Netherlands
Fencers at the 1912 Summer Olympics
Olympic bronze medalists for the Netherlands
Olympic medalists in fencing
Royal Netherlands Navy submarine commanders
Fencers from Amsterdam
Medalists at the 1912 Summer Olympics
20th-century Dutch people